Tanuku is a town in West Godavari district of the Indian state of Andhra Pradesh. It is the mandal headquarters of Tanuku mandal in Narasapuram revenue division. Tanuku is the fourth largest city in the West Godavari district after Bhimavaram, Tadepalligudem and Palakollu in terms of population.

History 

In the ancient period, the town was known as Tarakapuri, the capital of Asura King Tarakasura.

Geography 

The Gosthani River flows through the town.

Demographics 

 census of India, the town had a population 90,430.

Civic administration and politics 

Tanuku Municipality was constituted in 1979 as a second grade municipality. It was upgraded to first grade in 2002 and has 34 election wards. The present municipal chairman is SS REDDY GARU. and the municipal commissioner is M. Sambasivarao.

Tanuku assembly constituency represents Andhra Pradesh Legislative Assembly, which is one of the segment of Narasapuram Lok Sabha constituency, representing the Lok Sabha.

Economy 
Andhra Sugars Limited supplies liquid hydrogen to the ISRO, for using it as a rocket propellant in satellite launch vehicles. The other byproducts are also used in liquor, paper and power industries.

Culture 
Tanuku is the birthplace of Adikavi Nannaya, regarded as the first poet of Telugu language. He is credited with translation of  the Mahabharata from Sanskrit to Telugu. Javvadi Yamini Narasambika in dance, AJS Ramareddy in literature and poetry and Dampuri Narayanarao in folk arts have won the Ugadi Purasakarams, a cultural event organized on April 8, 2016 at YMHA hall, Eluru . The Youth Cultural Celebrations is one such example of promoting cultural activities.

Transport 
The Andhra Pradesh State Road Transport Corporation operates bus services from Tanuku bus station. Tanuku railway station is categorized as a Non-Suburban Grade-5 (NSG-5) station in the Vijayawada railway division.

Education 

The primary and secondary school education is imparted by government, aided and private schools, under the School Education Department of the state. The medium of instruction followed by different schools are English, Telugu. Higher education institutions include the SMVM Polytechnic College which provides technical courses. SKSD Mahila Kalasala which offers under graduate and post graduate courses.

Sports 
Chitturi Subba Rao – Gopichand Badminton Academy is the badminton academy under the Chitturi Subba Rao Trust for training the under 13 badminton players. The academy hosted the COSCO A.P. State Open Mini Badminton Championship 2016. The Tanuku Football Club is one of the teams in the Football League of West Godavari tournament, promoting the football.

Sports personalities from the city include Rella Sanjeeva Rao, an under-14 badminton player, top ranker for U-13 level, and gold medalist at national level championship.

See also 
 List of municipalities in Andhra Pradesh

References 

Cities and towns in West Godavari district
Mandal headquarters in West Godavari district